Grant Birchall (born 28 January 1988) is a former Australian rules football player who played with the Hawthorn Football Club and Brisbane Lions in the Australian Football League.

Career

Early career (2006–2008)
Birchall had an exceptional first season in 2006 with the Hawthorn, playing 16 games out of a possible 22. The Tasmanian was chosen at pick 14 in the 2005 AFL Draft and made his debut in the number 35 guernsey in Hawthorn's opening match of the season against Fremantle at Aurora Stadium in his home state, Tasmania.

All year, Birchall excelled across half-back for the Hawks, mainly highlighted by an impressive 23 touches in the big loss to St Kilda in round 13 and 27 touches and 10 marks in a sluggish win against the Kangaroos in round 21. To finish off the season, Birchall finished off with his best game yet- a massive 36 touches and 11 marks in the 10-goal win against Geelong.

At season's end, Birchall came sixth in the NAB AFL Rising Star, won Hawthorn's Best First Year Award and was given the number 14 jumper for the 2007 season, left vacant by Harry Miller, who was delisted by Hawthorn at the end of 2006. Grant Birchall attended St Brendan-Shaw College in Devonport, Tasmania.

2007 saw Birchall play every game for Hawthorn, and consolidate his role as a running half-back with poise and neat disposal. Many pundits are expecting the low-key young Hawk to make further progress in 2008, possibly including stints further up the ground.

Premierships (2008–2016)

Birchall played in his first AFL Premiership in 2008, when the Hawks defeated reigning premiers Geelong. Birchall lost half of his two front teeth in a collision during the match.

In 2012, Birchall had his best season to date. Birchall averaged 23.1 disposals in his 21 games in the Home and Away season with an incredible disposal efficiency of 85%. Birchall was rewarded with his first All-Australian Guernsey.

Injury troubles and trade (2017–2021)

Having only missed four of the Hawks' games over the previous three seasons, Grant Birchall's durability was struck down in 2017. Birchall managed just five games for the year, first suffering a fractured jaw in round 2 which kept him out for a month. before injuring his posterior cruciate ligament in round 7. Birchall made his return in round 14 before he injured his PCL again the following week, ending his season.

Birchall's poor luck continued through 2018 and he didn't play any football due to a persistent PCL complaint. A late-season push to be available for the finals resulted in an adductor injury.

After 720 days, Birchall made his long-awaited return playing for Hawthorn's VFL affiliate, Box Hill. He had a strong first half with 10 disposals and taking 6 marks before sitting out the second half of the game.

Out of contract at the end of 2019, Birchall was asked to shop himself around to see if he could get a better deal than what Hawthorn was willing to offer, Brisbane came up with a deal which he accepted. Birchall would be delisted at the end of 2020 and then re-drafted as a rookie. At the end of 2021, Birchall retired from the AFL.

Statistics

|- style=background:#EAEAEA
| 2006 ||  || 35
| 16 || 3 || 1 || 172 || 136 || 308 || 87 || 22 || 0.2 || 0.1 || 10.8 || 8.5 || 19.3 || 5.4 || 1.4 || 0
|-
| 2007 ||  || 14
| 24 || 2 || 5 || 292 || 215 || 507 || 153 || 42 || 0.1 || 0.2 || 12.2 || 9.0 || 21.1 || 6.4 || 1.8 || 2
|- style=background:#EAEAEA
| bgcolor=F0E68C | 2008# ||  || 14
| 25 || 2 || 1 || 281 || 266 || 547 || 164 || 44 || 0.1 || 0.0 || 11.2 || 10.6 || 21.9 || 6.6 || 1.8 || 0
|-
| 2009 ||  || 14
| 19 || 0 || 1 || 199 || 207 || 406 || 95 || 36 || 0.0 || 0.1 || 10.5 || 10.9 || 21.4 || 5.0 || 1.9 || 0
|- style=background:#EAEAEA
| 2010 ||  || 14
| 21 || 5 || 4 || 231 || 181 || 412 || 114 || 58 || 0.2 || 0.2 || 11.0 || 8.6 || 19.6 || 5.4 || 2.8 || 0
|-
| 2011 ||  || 14
| 24 || 3 || 7 || 344 || 226 || 570 || 173 || 38 || 0.1 || 0.3 || 14.3 || 9.4 || 23.8 || 7.2 || 1.6 || 7
|- style=background:#EAEAEA
| 2012 ||  || 14
| 23 || 1 || 4 || 315 || 216 || 531 || 135 || 38 || 0.0 || 0.2 || 13.7 || 9.4 || 23.1 || 5.9 || 1.7 || 1
|-
| bgcolor=F0E68C | 2013# ||  || 14
| 17 || 6 || 2 || 240 || 165 || 405 || 81 || 23 || 0.4 || 0.1 || 14.1 || 9.7 || 23.8 || 4.8 || 1.4 || 6
|- style=background:#EAEAEA
| bgcolor=F0E68C | 2014# ||  || 14
| 25 || 5 || 6 || 344 || 247 || 591 || 124 || 33 || 0.2 || 0.2 || 13.8 || 9.9 || 23.6 || 5.0 || 1.3 || 4
|-
| bgcolor=F0E68C | 2015# ||  || 14
| 22 || 4 || 3 || 319 || 183 || 502 || 122 || 36 || 0.2 || 0.1 || 14.5 || 8.3 || 22.8 || 5.6 || 1.6 || 0
|- style=background:#EAEAEA
| 2016 ||  || 14
| 24 || 2 || 2 || 318 || 232 || 550 || 147 || 29 || 0.1 || 0.1 || 13.3 || 9.7 || 22.9 || 6.1 || 1.2 || 2
|-
| 2017 ||  || 14
| 5 || 0 || 0 || 59 || 36 || 95 || 26 || 6 || 0.0 || 0.0 || 11.8 || 7.2 || 19.0 || 5.2 || 1.2 || 0
|- style=background:#EAEAEA
| 2018 ||  || 14
| 0 || — || — || — || — || — || — || — || — || — || — || — || — || — || — || 0
|-
| 2019 ||  || 14
| 3 || 1 || 1 || 35 || 27 || 62 || 16 || 2 || 0.3 || 0.3 || 11.7 || 9.0 || 20.7 || 5.3 || 0.7 || 0
|- style=background:#EAEAEA
| 2020 ||  || 14
| 16 || 0 || 0 || 150 || 53 || 203 || 69 || 16 || 0.0 || 0.0 || 9.4 || 3.3 || 12.7 || 4.3 || 1.0 || 0
|-
| 2021 ||  || 14
| 23 || 2 || 0 || 307 || 118 || 425 || 159 || 23 || 0.1 || 0.0 || 13.3 || 5.1 || 18.5 || 6.9 || 1.0 || 0
|- class="sortbottom"
! colspan=3| Career
! 287 !! 36 !! 37 !! 3606 !! 2508 !! 6114 !! 1665 !! 446 !! 0.1 !! 0.1 !! 12.6 !! 8.7 !! 21.3 !! 5.8 !! 1.6 !! 22
|}

Notes

Honours and achievements
Team
 4× AFL premiership player: 2008, 2013, 2014, 2015
 2× Minor premiership: 2012, 2013

Individual
 All-Australian team: 2012
  best first year player (debut season): 2006
 AFL Rising Star nominee: 2006
 2× Australia international rules football team: 2014, 2015
 Under 18 All-Australian team: 2005
 Tasmanian Football Hall of Fame
  life member

Notes

External links

Hawthorn Football Club players
Hawthorn Football Club Premiership players
Box Hill Football Club players
Devonport Football Club players
People from Devonport, Tasmania
Australian rules footballers from Tasmania
Tassie Mariners players
All-Australians (AFL)
1988 births
Living people
Australia international rules football team players
Brisbane Lions players
Four-time VFL/AFL Premiership players